Beltrami TSA–Tre Colli is an Italian UCI Continental team founded in 2016. The team upgraded from amateur status to UCI Continental level in 2019.

Team roster

References

External links

UCI Continental Teams (Europe)
Cycling teams based in Italy